Srimati Tara Singh (born 10 October 1952) is an Indian writer and poet who writes in Hindi. Since childhood she took special interest in dance and music as well as in writing poems. On several occasions she was awarded prizes and letter of appreciation for her poems and performances in literary debates during school and college career.

Biography 
After completing her graduation in Arts and marriage with a Kolkata college Head of Department of Chemistry, she devoted her whole time and energy in serving Hindi literature. Soon her writings got recognition by Star TV shows and regularly published in several newspapers and magazines. On publication of two poetry books, she got wide applause for her emotional and thoughtful poems. Subsequent but regular & talented publication of books on family and social issues, personal and social delicacies, philosophy of life and realities, birth and death cycles, etc. soon established herself as modern "Chhayabadi Poetess" of 21st Century in Hindi literature. She has been already awarded 253 awards from different national and international organizations.

Literary works
No. of books published - 51 namely:
(i) Poetry Books – 21
(ii) Gazal Books – 8
(iii) Story book − 13
(iv) Novel − 6  
(v) Essay Books - 2
(vi) Children's books - 1
Also her 115 joint-poetry collections are already published. Her articles are published on 29 popular Hindi websites including swargvibha and one song was selected as title song of a Hindi movie 'SIPAIJI' released in 2008.
Her 8 Audio Books (Novel -2, Story Books -3, Poetry Books -3) are being broadcast continuously by Kuku FM and are drawing excellent response from listeners and literary lovers.

Present engagement
She is the founder president of the Hindi website Swargvibha and Chief Editor of swargvibha online quarterly magazine, which has numerous collections & gives away Swargvibha Tara award to promising Hindi writers/ journalists every year.
She is the working president of the Sahityik, Sanskritik and Kala Sangam Academy, Pratapgarh (U.P.). She takes keen interest in writing poems, gazals, stories, novels and filmy songs.

References
 TARA SINGH (AUTHOR), Biography—Barnes and Noble, N.J., U.S.A.
 Afro-Asian who's who Part-1, 2006
 Asia-Pacific who's who Part-6, 2006
 Rising Personalities of India Award book, 2006
 Best citizens of India book, 2008 , Page 66
 Asia-Pacific who's who Part-11, Page 376, 2012
 Asian Admirable achievers, Part-7, 2013, Page 165
 Asia-Pacific who's who Part-14, Page 411, 2016
 Asian-American who's who Part-7, Page-639, 2015
 Asian-American who's who Part-8, Page-384, 2017

Living people
Indian women novelists
Hindi-language poets
1952 births